Dorothy Tennov (August 29, 1928 – February 3, 2007) was an American psychologist who, in her 1979 book Love and Limerence – the Experience of Being in Love introduced the term "limerence".  During her years of research into romantic love experiences, she obtained thousands of personal testimonies from questionnaires, interviews, and letters from readers of her writing, in an attempt to support her hypothesis that a distinct and involuntary psychological state occurs identically among otherwise normal persons across cultures, educational level, gender, and other traits. Tennov emphasized that her data consist entirely of verbal reports by volunteers who reported their love experiences.

About
Dorothy Tennov was born in Montgomery County, Alabama. She received her bachelor's degree from Brooklyn College and a Ph.D. from the University of Connecticut. She was a professor of psychology at the University of Bridgeport for twenty years. In addition to being a professor of psychology she was also a student of the philosophy of science.

She had three sons: Randall Hoffman (d. Nov. 19, 1994), Ace Hoffman and Daniel Hoffman. Since 1986 she lived in Millsboro, Delaware, where she lectured at the local senior learning academy and worked as a volunteer at the nursing home. She was passionate about music, especially classical. She could play the piano, which she did in a local church. She volunteered at the community theatre, Possum Point Players. Tennov died in Harbeson, Delaware at the age of 78 in 2007.

Publications 
She was an author of three published nonfiction books, including Love and Limerence, Psychotherapy: The Hazardous Cure, and Super Self: A woman's guide to self-management.  Among her other writings were a prize-winning play about life in a nursing home, reviews of books on scientific subjects, presentations at scientific meetings, and essays. Her television credits included a PBS interview with the late French novelist and essayist, Simone de Beauvoir and appearance in a 1998 BBC documentary, The Evolution of Desire. She participated in Internet discussions on scientific and political topics while conducting research for a forthcoming book in which she planned more fully to analyze the methodologies and philosophies of the human sciences.

 
 
 
 Tennov, Dorothy (2005). A Scientist Looks at Romantic Love and Calls It "Limerence": The Collected Works of Dorothy Tennov. Greenwich, CT: The Great American Publishing Society (GRAMPS), www.gramps.org/limerence.

References

External links
 Book review of Love and Limerence

American women psychologists
20th-century American psychologists
American psychology writers
University of Bridgeport alumni
Writers from Montgomery, Alabama
1929 births
2007 deaths
Brooklyn College alumni
20th-century American women
20th-century American people
21st-century American women